Ivan Federico (born 20 March 1999 in Cirié) is an Italian skateboarder. He has competed in men's park events at several World Skate Championships, notably winning bronze in 2016. He has also competed at X Games, finishing fourth in 2017 and winning gold in 2019.

He competed in the men's park event at the 2021 Tokyo Olympics, finishing in 18th place.

References 

Italian skateboarders
Skateboarders at the 2020 Summer Olympics
1999 births
Living people
Olympic skateboarders of Italy
People from Cirié
World Skateboarding Championship medalists
Sportspeople from the Metropolitan City of Turin